Loss and Regeneration is a 1993 bronze sculpture by Joel Shapiro, installed at the United States Holocaust Memorial Museum in Washington, D.C.

See also
 List of public art in Washington, D.C., Ward 2

References

External links
 

1993 establishments in Washington, D.C.
1993 sculptures
Bronze sculptures in Washington, D.C.
Jews and Judaism in Washington, D.C.
Outdoor sculptures in Washington, D.C.
Southwest Federal Center